Baler National High School was built in February 1993 on agricultural land in Barangay Pingit. It started with 110 students and 3 teachers. To date, it is the biggest public secondary schools in Aurora, with close to 1,300 students. It now follows the K-12 program for the Filipinos in order to excel both The Philippines and the World.

Its facilities include a covered court, internet and computer laboratory, science laboratory, canteen, music room, clinic, guidance office and 25 classrooms ( The government of Australia and the Philippines built a new building compromising of 6 classrooms, to be used by the school-year 2014–2015). The weather condition in Baler is unpredictable. Further, since it is situated near a river, when it rains, it floods easily.

Sections 
It is divided into a Regular Section and a S.T.E.M Section.

Regular Section 
This section mostly consists of 6 bi-sections, depending on the number of enrollees. Identifying themselves as bi-section A-F,G,H or so on.

S.T.E.M. (Science, Technology, Engineering and Mathematics) Section 
This section only consists of one bi-section per grade. It offers the highest education for public schools in the whole province.

S.P.A.(Special Program in the Arts) section 
The SPA section has four sections which is Dance, Vocal, Instruments, and Visual Arts.

Hymn

References

High schools in the Philippines
Schools in Aurora (province)